The Tarynnakh mine is a large iron mine located in eastern Russia in Olyokminsky District, Sakha Republic
. Tarynnakh represents one of the largest iron ore reserves in Russia and in the world having estimated reserves of 2 billion tonnes of ore grading 28.1% iron metal.

References 

Iron mines in Russia